A beauty mark or beauty spot is a euphemism for a type of dark facial mark so named because such birthmarks are sometimes considered an attractive feature. Medically, such "beauty marks" are generally melanocytic nevus, more specifically the compound variant. Moles of this type may also be located elsewhere on the body, and may also be considered beauty marks if located on the face, shoulder, neck or breast. Artificial beauty marks have been fashionable in some periods.

Artificial beauty mark

Artificial beauty marks, or mouches (Fr. flies), became fashionable in sixteenth-century France, and the fashion persisted into the eighteenth century.  When the fashion spread to Spain and the Spanish Empire they were called a chiqueador. 

A mouche was generally made of silk or velvet and was applied to the face as a form of make-up.  They were kept in a patch box, or boîte à mouches (Fr. box of flies), and were often fanciful shapes such as hearts or stars. Besides their decorative value, the patches could hide smallpox scars or syphilis sores. 

Alexander Pope's 1712 poem The Rape of the Lock mentions such patches as indicators of "secular love":

Here Files of Pins extend their shining Rows,
Puffs, Powders, Patches, Bibles, Billet-doux.
Now awful Beauty puts on all its Arms;
The Fair each moment rises in her Charms,
Repairs her Smiles, awakens ev'ry Grace,
And calls forth all the Wonders of her Face;

The Monroe piercing has gained popularity in recent years as a flexible way of approximating a beauty mark. Natural beauty marks are also often enhanced with color from an eyebrow pencil or pen.

People with notable beauty marks
Many female sex symbols, actresses, and other celebrities are known for their beauty marks:

 Dolly Parton, born 1946
 Gloria Swanson, born 1899
 Arlene Dahl, born 1925
 Jean Patchett, born 1926
 Marilyn Monroe, born 1926
 Anne Francis, born 1930
 Elizabeth Taylor, born 1932
 Sophia Loren, born 1934
 Tina Louise, born 1934
 Kate Pierson, born 1948
 Christine Baranski, born 1952
 Sheryl Crow, born 1962
 Lisa Marie Presley, born 1968
 Mel B, born 1975
 Charli XCX, born 1992
 Lady Gaga, born 1986
 Sarah Buxton, born 1980
 Karlie Kloss, born 1992
 Caroline Polachek, born 1985
 Elizabeth Perkins, born 1960
 Pink, born 1979
 Rachel McAdams, born 1978
 Kim Cattrall, born 1956
 Edie Sedgwick, born 1943
 Paloma Picasso, born 1949
 Madonna, born 1958
 Paula Abdul, born 1962
 Michelle Forbes, born 1965
 Cindy Crawford, born 1966 
 Janet Jackson, born 1966
 Mariah Carey, born 1969
 Natalie Portman, born 1981
 Blake Lively, born 1987
 Geena Davis, born 1956
 Mandy Moore, born 1984
 Aly Michalka, born 1989
 BC Jean, born 1987
 AJ Lee, born 1987
 Kate Upton, born 1992
 Lil' Kim, born 1976
 Eva Mendes, born 1974
 Phoebe Dynevor, born 1995
 Son Chaeyoung, born 1999

Male actors known for their beauty marks include:
 George Hamilton, born 1939
 Robert De Niro, born 1943
 Joaquin Phoenix, born 1974
 Colin Farrell, born 1976
 Adam Driver, born 1983
 Tobey Maguire, born 1975

In fiction
In the conclusion of the book The Silence of the Lambs, the heroine Clarice Starling gains an artificial beauty mark when burnt gunpowder gets lodged in the flesh of her cheek. She retains this mark in the sequel novel Hannibal. This symbolism (along with Dr. Lecter's polydactylism) did not get carried over into the film.

Joan Crawford had a prominent beauty mark in her role as Sadie Thompson in Rain.

See also 
 Bindi (decoration)
 Birthmark
 Freckles
 Melanocytic nevus
 Monroe piercing

References

Cosmetics
Skin pigmentation